Reservation is a system of affirmative action in India that provides historically disadvantaged groups representation in education, employment, government schemes, scholarships and politics. Based on provisions in the Indian Constitution, it allows the Union Government and the States and Territories of India to set reserved quotas or seats, at particular percentage in  Education Admissions, Employments, Political Bodies, Promotions, etc, for "socially and educationally backward citizens."

History

Before independence
Quota systems favouring certain castes and other communities existed before independence in several areas of British India. Demands for various forms of positive discrimination had been made, for example, in 1882 and 1891. Rajarshi Shahu, the Maharaja of the princely state of Kolhapur, introduced reservation in favor of non-Brahmin and backward classes, much of which came into force in 1902. He provided free education to everyone and opened several hostels to make it easier for them to receive it. He also tried to ensure that people thus educated were suitably employed, and he appealed both for a class-free India and the abolition of untouchability. His 1902 measures created 50 percent reservation for backward communities. In 1918, at the behest of several non-Brahmin organizations criticizing Brahmin domination of administration, the Mysore Raja Nalvadi Krishnaraja Wadiyar created a committee to implement reservations for non-Brahmins in government jobs and education over the opposition of his Diwan M. Viswesvaraya, who resigned in protest. On 16 September 1921, the first Justice Party government passed the first Communal Government Order (G. O. # 613), thereby becoming the first elected body in the Indian legislative history to legislate reservations, which have since become standard across the country.

The British Raj introduced elements of reservation in the Government of India Act of 1909 and there were many other measures put in place prior to independence. A significant one emerged from the Round Table Conference of June 1932, when the Prime Minister of Britain, Ramsay MacDonald, proposed the Communal Award, according to which separate representation was to be provided for Muslims, Sikhs, Indian Christians, Anglo-Indians, and Europeans. The depressed classes, roughly corresponding to the STs and SCs, were assigned a number of seats to be filled by election from constituencies in which only they could vote, although they could also vote in other seats. The proposal was controversial: Mahatma Gandhi fasted in protest against it but many among the depressed classes, including B. R. Ambedkar, favored it. After negotiations, Gandhi reached an agreement with Ambedkar to have a single Hindu electorate, with Dalits having seats reserved within it. Electorates for other religions, such as Islam and Sikhism, remained separate. This became known as the Poona Pact.

After independence
After the independence of India in 1947 there were some major initiatives in favor of the Scheduled Castes and Scheduled Tribes (SCs and STs) and after the 1980s in favour of OBCs (Other Backward Castes) and in 2019 for poor in the general category. The country's affirmative action program was launched in 1950 and is the oldest such programme in the world.

A common form of caste discrimination in India was the practice of untouchability. SCs were the primary targets of the practice, which was outlawed by the new Constitution of India.

In 1954, the Ministry of Education suggested that 20 percent of places should be reserved for the SCs and STs in educational institutions with a provision to relax minimum qualifying marks for admission by 5 percent wherever required. In 1982, it was specified that 15 percent and 7.5 percent of vacancies in public sector and government-aided educational institutes should be reserved for the SC and ST candidates, respectively.

A significant change began in 1979 when the Mandal Commission or the Socially and Educationally Backward Classes (SEBC) Commission was established to assess the situation of the socially and educationally backward classes. The commission did not have exact population figures for the OBCs and so used data from the 1931 census, thus estimating the group's population at 52 per cent. In 1980, the commission's report recommended that a reserved quota for OBCs of 27 per cent should apply in respect of services and public sector bodies operated by the Union Government. It called for a similar change to admissions to institutes of higher education, except where states already had more generous requirements. It was not until the 1990s that the recommendations were implemented in Union Government jobs. In 2019 the government announces the 10% reservation in educational institutions and government jobs for economically weaker section of the general category.

The Constitution of India states in article 15(4): "Nothing in [article 15] or in clause (2) of article 29 shall prevent the State from making any special provision for the advancement of any socially, and educationally backward classes of citizens of or for the Scheduled Castes and the Scheduled Tribes." Article 46 of the Constitution states that "The State shall promote with special care the educational and economic interests of the weaker sections of the people, and, in particular, of the Scheduled Castes and the Scheduled Tribes, and shall protect them from social injustice and all forms of exploitation."

The Supreme Court of India ruled in 1992 that reservations could not exceed 50 percent, anything above which it judged would violate equal access as guaranteed by the Constitution. It thus put a cap on reservations. However, the recent amendment of the constitution exceeds 50% and also there are state laws that exceed this 50 percent limit and these are under litigation in the Supreme Court. For example, in the State of Tamil Nadu, the caste-based reservation stands at 69 percent and applies to about 87 percent of the population.

On 7 November 2022, Supreme Court of India by a 3:2 verdict in Janhit Abhiyan vs Union Of India  Writ Petition (Civil) No(S). 55 OF 2019, upheld the validity of the 103rd constitutional amendment carried out to provide legal sanction carve out 10% reservation for the economically weaker sections from unreserved classes for admission in educational institutions and government jobs and held that the 50% cap on quota is not inviolable and affirmative action on economic basis may go a long way in eradicating caste-based reservation. This constitutional amendment pushed the total reservation to 59.50% in central institutions.

Reservation schemes

In employment
Government and public sector will hire job seekers based on reservation percentage from two different categories 1: reservation category (SC, ST, OBC, EWC and other minorities) 2:Open category (General, SC, ST, OBC, EWC and other minorities).
While hiring, major priority is given to reservation category including 33% reservation for Women, priority in hiring is given by Other Minorities women, ST women, SC women, ST Men, SC Men, OBC women, OBC Men, EWS Women, EWS Men and then after Open category Will be considered. 
Government and public sector hiring based on Merit in open category and one more anomaly here i.e., Priority in hiring will be given by: Other Minorities women, ST women, SC women, ST Men, SC Men, OBC women, OBC Men, EWC Women, EWC Men and then General if they are equally eligibility (for example having same marks or Rank).
The landmark initiative of Special Recruitment for Scheduled Caste and Scheduled Tribe in Government jobs was started in Kerala in 1972 by Vella Eacharan. 
The 1993 Supreme Court ruling in the Indra Sawhney & Others v. Union of India case said that reservations in job promotions are "unconstitutional" or not in accordance with the political constitution but allowed its continuation for five years. In 1995, the 77th amendment to the Constitution was made to amend Article 16 before the five-year period expired to continue with reservations for SC/STs in promotions. It was further modified through the 85th amendment to give the benefit of consequential seniority to SC/ST candidates promoted by reservation.

The 81st amendment was made to the Constitution to permit the government to treat the backlog of reserved vacancies as a separate and distinct group, to which the ceiling of 50 per cent did not apply. The 82nd amendment inserted a provision in Article 335 to enable states to give concessions to SC/ST candidates in promotion.

The validity of all the above four amendments was challenged in the Supreme Court through various petitions clubbed together in M. Nagaraj & Others Vs. Union of India & Others, mainly on the ground that these altered the Basic Structure of the Constitution. In 2006, the Supreme Court upheld the amendments but stipulated that the concerned state will have to show, in each case, the existence of "compelling reasons" - which include "backwardness", "inadequacy of representation" and overall "administrative efficiency - before making provisions for reservation. The court further held that these provisions are merely enabling provisions. If a state government wishes to make provisions for reservation to SC/STs in the promotion, the state has to collect quantifiable data showing backwardness of the class and inadequacy of representation of that class.

In 2007, the Government of Uttar Pradesh introduced reservation in job promotions. However, citing the Supreme Court decision, the policy was ruled to be unconstitutional by the Allahabad High Court in 2011. The decision was challenged in the Supreme Court, which upheld it in 2012 by rejecting the government's argument because it failed to furnish sufficient valid data to justify the move to promote employees on a caste basis.

In education
Universities allot seats based on reservation percentage from two different categories are 1: reservation category (SC, ST, OBC, EWC and other minorities) 2:Open category (General, SC, ST, OBC, EWS and other minorities).
In allotment, Major priority given to reservation category including 33% reservation for Women, priority in allotting is given by Other Minorities women, ST women, SC women, ST Men, SC Men, OBC women, OBC Men, EWC Women, EWC Men and then after Open category Will be considered. 
Government Universities will allot based on priority by: Other Minorities women, ST women, SC women, ST Men, SC Men, OBC women, OBC Men, EWC Women, EWC Men & then General and reservation percentage under consideration for entrance exams fees, for cut off marks, for allotment of seats and also applicable to other government schemes.

In India student aids are available for—SCs, STs, BCs, OBCs, women, Muslims, and other minorities. Only about 0.7% of student aids in India is based on merit, given the grossly inadequate representation of above-mentioned categories in employment and education due to historic, societal and cultural reasons.

States 
In central-government funded higher education institutions, 22.5% of available seats are reserved for Scheduled Caste (SC) and Scheduled Tribe (ST) students (7.5% for STs, 15% for SCs,20% for ESC,12% for SCA,16% for SCB,22% for SCC,18% for SCD). This reservation percentage has been raised to 49.5% by including an additional 27% reservation for OBCs. This ratio is followed even in Parliament and all elections where a few constituencies are earmarked for those from certain communities (which will next rotate in 2026 per the Delimitation Commission). Some states and UTs have reservations for females which varies from 5% to 33.33%.

The exact percentages vary from state to state:

 In Tamil Nadu, OBC reservation is divided into 26.5% Backward Caste, 3.5 Backward Caste (M) and 20% Most Backward Caste and 10.5% sub quota for vanniyars, introduced by AIADMK in 2020,7% for DNT . The 7.5% for Vanniyars was quashed void by Madras High Court. The SC quota has 3% sub-quota for Arunthatiyars, introduced by DMK in 2009.
 In Maharashtra in addition to the reservation for SC/ST/OBC, there is 2% for SBCs, 3% for Nomadic Tribes – NT-A (Vimukta jati), 2.5% for NT-B, 3.5% for NT-C (Dhangar), and 2% for NT-D (Vanjari).
 In Northeast India, e.g. in Arunachal Pradesh, Meghalaya, Nagaland and Mizoram, reservation for ST in State Govt. jobs is 80% with only 20% unreserved. In the Central Universities of NEHU (Shillong) and Rajiv Gandhi University, 60% of seats are reserved for ST students.
 In West Bengal, the OBC community is divided into OBC A & B. In West Bengal there is no reservation on religious basis but some economically and educationally backward Muslim castes (basis surnames pertaining to different profession e.g. cobbler, weaver etc.) have been included along with their Hindu counterparts in the OBC list namely OBC A and OBC B, in both lists caste from both communities are there. But in higher educational institutes, till now there is no reservation for the OBC community but there is reservation in regard to admission in primary, secondary and higher secondary studies.

Gender
The Women's Reservation Bill was passed by the Rajya Sabha on 9 March 2010 by a majority vote of 186 members in favor and 1 against. As of March 2013, the Lok Sabha has not voted on the bill. Critics say gender cannot be held as a basis for reservation alone other factors should also be considered e.g. economic, social conditions of woman candidates especially when applying reservation for educated women. The criticism points that the policy benefits women that have access to political capital through family circles and are faced with the burden of a huge learning curve. Again, women are  divided  among  caste  and  class  lines  with  this  dichotomy  playing  an  important  role  in deciding  how  the  presence  of  women  in  the  lowest  tier  of  governance  impact  the  problems faced by the women of the constituency

In Gujarat and Andhra Pradesh, 32% of posts are reserved for females in all government departments and services, such as police, health, education and general administration. From 2015 onwards Kerala has implemented a 55% reservation for all posts of its local self governing bodies.

On 21 July 2021, Karnataka became the first state in the country to provide one percent reservation for the transgender community in all government services. The government submitted a report to the High Court in this regard, informing that a notification had already been issued after amending the Karnataka Civil Service. The job could be given to males or females, from the same category, in case of the non-availability of transgender candidates.

Religion
The Tamil Nadu government has allotted 3.5% of seats each to Muslims and Christians, thereby altering the OBC reservation to 23% from 30% (since it excludes persons belonging to Other Backward Castes who are either Muslims or Christians).

The Government of Andhra Pradesh introduced a law enabling 4 percent reservations for Muslims in 2004. This law was upheld by the Supreme Court in an interim order in 2010 but it constituted a Constitution bench to look further into the issue. The referral was to examine the constitutional validity of quotas based on religion. Kerala Public Service Commission has a quota of 12% for Muslims. Religious minority (Muslim or Christian) educational institutes also have 50% reservation for Muslim or Christian religions. The Central government has listed a number of Muslim communities as backward Muslims, making them eligible for reservation.

Criticism, controversies and protests
The Union Government on 22 December 2011 announced the establishment of a sub-quota of 4.5% for religious minorities within the existing 27% reservation for Other Backward Classes. The reasoning given was that Muslim communities that have been granted OBC status are unable to compete with Hindu OBC communities. It was alleged that the decision was announced as the Election Commission announced Assembly elections in five states on 24 December 2011. The government would not have been able to announce this due to the model code of conduct. On 12 January 2012, the Election Commission stayed implementation of this decision for violation of the model code of conduct. Later, Justice Sachar, head of the Sachar Committee that was commissioned to prepare a report on the latest social, economic and educational condition of the Muslim community of India, criticised the government decision, saying "Such promises will not help the backward section of minorities. It is like befooling them. These people are making tall claims just to win elections". He suggested that instead of promising to give reservations, the government should focus on basic issues of improving administration and governance.

On 28 May 2012, the Andhra Pradesh High Court quashed the sub-quota. The court said that the sub-quota has been carved out only on religious lines and not on any other intelligible basis. The court criticized the decision: "In fact, we must express our anguish at the rather casual manner in which the entire issue has been taken up by the central government.".

Mandal Commission protests of 1990 

Mandal commission protests of 1990 were against reservation in government jobs based on caste in India.

2006 Indian anti-reservation protests 

The 2006 Indian anti-reservation protests were a series of protests that took place in India in 2006 in opposition to the decision of the Union Government of India, led by the Indian National Congress-headed multiparty coalition United Progressive Alliance, to implement reservations for the Other Backward Classes (OBCs) in central and private institutes of higher education. This move led to massive protests, particularly from students and doctors belonging to the forward castes, who claimed that the government's proposal was discriminatory, discarded meritocracy and was driven by vote-bank politics.

Agitations demanding more reservation 
In 2008 and 2010, the Gujjar community in Rajasthan demanded reclassification from OBC to ST (Scheduled Tribes) for increased reservation benefits. They began violently protesting on the streets of Rajasthan and blocked several rail lines. Police firing on Gujjars began a tit-for-tat cycle of violence between Police and Gujjars. The violence ended with 37 people dead. Their move was opposed by the Meenas, the main ST community in Rajasthan.

In 2019, the agitation restarted as Gujjars demanded 5% reservation, and began blocking trains to this effect.

Jats have been demanding OBC status since the 1990s. In 2016, they began an agitation to get this status. To this effect they began protesting by blockading roads and lines, but later the protests turned violent. Riots spread to Delhi and western Uttar Pradesh, and even Rajasthan. The epicentre of the violence was in Rothak, and almost ₹34000 crores ($4.8 billion) worth of property was damaged and 30 were killed. Bowing to the pressure, the Haryana government created a special category for Jats and other upper castes called BC, and appointed 10% reservation, but the measure was blocked in court.

Beginning in 2015, the Patidar community (better known as Patel) began agitating for OBC status in Gujarat. This movement consisted of massive demonstrations across the state, led by Hardik Patel. Later many of these protests turned violent, resulting in curfews across the state and crores worth of damage. Talks with the government broke down, and the violence restarted. After the Jat agitation began in 2016, the Patidars flared up again and led a march through Gujarat, but protests in several cities turned violent and the Rapid Action Force was sent in.

In January 2016, the Garp community in Andhra Pradesh began leading protests to be classified in Backward Classes. The agitation became violent when in Tuni, Garp protestors set trains on fire. In 2019, the Telugu Desam Party which had just been made opposition, tabled a bill to have a 5% sub-quota for Garps out of EWS reservation.

Marathas, the dominant caste of Maharashtra, have been agitating for OBC status since the 1990s. In 2016, after the rape and murder of a 15-year old Maratha girl in Kopardi, the Maratha community organized massive protests throughout Maharashtra. Their demands included death for the accused as well as reservations for the Maratha community which makes up 16% of the state's population. Some road blocks turned violent in 2017 and 2018, but overall the protests were peaceful. Their demand was met when the Maharashtra government instituted a special SEBC (Socially and Educationally Backward Classes) category for them with 16% reservation. The Supreme Court of India later however, declared the SEBC reservation for Marathas as unconstitutional.

Economic status 
The Union Government tabled the Constitution (One Hundred And Twenty-Fourth Amendment) Bill, 2019 which provided 10% additional quota for the economically weaker sections amongst the erstwhile unreserved category students. The definition of 'economically weaker sections' will be defined by the State from time to time. The constitutional amendment has laid down that they will be restricted to people with household income less than 8 Lakh per annum and those who own agricultural land below five acres. Business Today has commented that these criteria cover almost 100 percent of the population. Several petitions have been filed before the Supreme Court of India challenging the legality of this amendment.

Exclusions
There are no exclusions for SC/ST people.

For OBC's people the following categories are not entitled to take advantage of the reservation system:
 Children of officials in high office as per the Constitution.
 Children of civil servants in high positions.
 Children of armed forces officers of high rank.
 Children of professionals and those engaged in trade and industry.
 Children of property owners.
 Children of people with annual income exceeding 8,00,000 (regarded as the "creamy layer").

Institutions of Excellence, research institutions, Institutions of National and Strategic Importance such as Centre for Development of Advanced Computing, Homi Bhabha National Institute and its ten constituent units, the Tata Institute of Fundamental Research (Mumbai), the North Eastern Indira Gandhi Regional Institute of Health and Medical Sciences (Shillong), Physical Research Laboratory (Ahmedabad), the Vikram Sarabhai Space Centre (Thiruvananthapuram) and the Indian Institute of Remote Sensing (Dehradun) do not have reservations for higher education. However Institutes of National Importance such as Indian Institutes of Management (IIMs),Indian Institutes of Technology (IITs), National Institutes of Technology (NIT) and Indian Institute of Information Technology (IIIT) have provision of reservation in admission process for undergraduate and graduate programs.

On 27 October 2015, the Supreme Court directed the state and the Central governments to end the regional quota and to ensure that super-specialty medical courses are kept "unreserved, open and free" from any domicile status after the court had allowed petitions files by some MBBS doctors.

The above table is valid as of January 31, 2023.

Creamy layer

The term creamy layer was first coined in 1974 in the State of Kerala vs N. M. Thomas case when a judge said that the "benefits of the reservation shall be snatched away by the top creamy layer of the backward class, thus leaving the weakest among the weak and leaving the fortunate layers to consume the whole cake". The 1992 Indra Sawhney & Others v. Union of India judgement laid down the limits of the state's powers: it upheld the ceiling of 50.21 percent quotas, emphasised the concept of "social backwardness", and prescribed 11 indicators to ascertain backwardness. The judgement also established the concept of qualitative exclusion, such as "creamy layer". The creamy layer applies only to OBCs. The creamy layer criteria were introduced at Rs 1 lakh in 1993 and revised to Rs 2.5 lakh in 2004, ₹4.5 lakh in 2008 and ₹6 lakh in 2013, but now the ceiling has been raised to ₹8 lakh (in September 2017). In October 2015, the National Commission for Backward Classes (NCBC) proposed that a person belonging to OBC with an annual family income of up to ₹15 lakh should be considered as minimum ceiling for OBC. The NCBC also recommended sub-division of OBCs into "backward", "more backward" and "extremely backward" groups and to divide the 27 per cent quota amongst them in proportion to their population, to ensure that stronger OBCs do not corner the quota benefits.

Reservation in states

 Andhra Pradesh 
Andhra Pradesh state percentage of reservation is around 50%. Including the overall 1/3 reservation for women, 66.66% of seats are reserved in Andhra Pradesh in Education and Government jobs.

 Scheduled Castes – 15%
 Scheduled Tribes – 6%
 Backward Classes (A, B, C, D) – 27%
 Physically Handicapped (Blind, Deaf & Dumb and OPH) – 3% (1% each)
 Ex-servicemen (APMS only) – 1% (0.5% in general category)
 Women – 33.33% (in all categories, means 16.66% in general category)

Andhra Pradesh BC quota has sub-quotas for castes, classified in A, B, C and D. Addition of disabled, ex-serviceman, women in general category 16.66% makes total reservation percentage 66.66%.  

 Arunachal Pradesh 
Arunachal Pradesh has 80% reservation for Scheduled Tribes.

 Assam 

 Scheduled Castes – 7%
 Scheduled Tribes – 15%
 Other Backward Classes – 27%
 Economically Weaker Sections – 10%

Assam provides sub quotas for several other communities such as Morans, Mataks and Tea Tribes in medical colleges under the OBC category. In November 2020, Assam's cabinet extended this reservation to Koch-Rajbongshis, Ahoms and Chutias. These six communities are demanding Scheduled Tribe status.

In January 2019, Assam approved EWS reservation.

 Bihar 

 Scheduled Castes – 15%
 Scheduled Tribes – 1%
 Other Backward Classes – 34%
Economically Weaker Sections – 10%

First implemented in 1970 by Garpoori Thakur, Bihar has a sub-quota within OBC quota of 18% for Extremely Backward Castes (EBCs) and 3% for Backward Caste women in government jobs and educational institutes. EWS reservation was implemented in 2019.

 Chhattisgarh 

 Scheduled Castes – 12% ( now 16%)
 Scheduled Tribes – 32% ( now 20%)
 Other Backward Classes – 14%
 Economically Weaker Sections – no provision

Chhattisgarh: Ordinance on OBC quota hike to 27% has lapsed, says high court.

 Delhi 

 Scheduled Castes - 15%
 Scheduled Tribes - 7%
 Other Backward Classes - 27%

Since Delhi is a Union territory and subject to the Central government, government jobs in Delhi are designated Central Government jobs. In a 2018 Supreme Court decision, it was decided that since Delhi is the capital and no one is an "outsider" there reservations in the territory should follow the all-India pattern. Furthermore, these reserved jobs are open from reserved communities from outside Delhi.

 Goa 

 Scheduled Castes – 2%
 Scheduled Tribes – 12%
 Other Backward Classes – 27%
 Economically Weaker Sections – 10%
 Physically handicapped - 3%
 Ex-servicemen - 2%
 Sportspersons - 3%

In 2014, the quota for OBC reservation was raised from 19.5% to 27%. In June 2019, Goa implemented EWS reservation in jobs and education.

 Gujarat 

 Scheduled Castes – 7%
 Scheduled Tribes – 15%
 Other Backward Classes – 27%
 Economically Weaker Sections – 10%

Gujarat also implemented a 33% reservation for general category women in government jobs. The government also banned reserved category applicants from competing for general category seats, but this was revoked in 2020. Similarly the women reservation was made cutting across all categories in 2020. Gujarat was one of the first states to implement EWS reservation, which applies to general category candidates with less than ₹8 lakhs income, not including other assets like land.

 Haryana 

Scheduled Castes – 20%
 Other Backward Classes – 23%
 Economically Weaker Sections – 10%
Ex-servicemen – 5%
Sportspersons – 3%
Physically handicapped – 3%

In Haryana OBCs are divided into A, B, C categories, each with 11%, 6% and 6% reservation respectively. Reservations in promotions are different, although still based on population. In 2021, Haryana passed a law mandating 75% reservation in private-sector jobs with incomes less than ₹25,000 for local candidates.

 Himachal Pradesh 

Scheduled Castes – 25%
Scheduled Tribes – 4%
 Other Backward Classes – 20%
 Economically Weaker Sections – 10%

In the Scheduled Areas which have a very high percentage of STs, such as Kinnaur and Lahaul and Spiti districts, percentage of ST reserved seats in government jobs are much higher.

 Jharkhand 

 Scheduled Castes – 10%
 Scheduled Tribes – 26%
 Other Backward Classes – 14% 
 Economically Weaker Sections – 10%

BC are currently classified as being in Annexure 1 and Annexure 2. 

 Maharashtra 
 Scheduled Castes (SC) (13%)
 Scheduled Tribes (ST) (7%)
 Other Backward Classes (OBC) (19%)
 Special Backward Classes (SBC) (2%)
 Nomadic Tribes – A (Vimukta jati) (3%)
 Nomadic Tribes – B (2.5%)
 Nomadic Tribes – C (Dhangar) (3.5%)
 Nomadic Tribes – D (Vanjari) (2%)
 Economically Weaker Sections (EWS) – 10%

Maharashtra has 62% reservation in educational institutions and government jobs.

 Uttarakhand 

 Scheduled Castes – 19%
 Scheduled Tribes – 4%
 Other Backward Classes – 14%
 Economically Weaker Sections – 10%

Uttarakhand has 47% reservation in educational institutions and government jobs. In addition to vertical reservation, the state gives 30% horizontal reservation to women, 5% to the ex-servicemen (ES), 4% to persons with disability (PWD), 2% to the dependants of freedom fighters (DFF), and 5% to the orphans residing in the state-run orphanages.

See also
Backwardism
Affirmative action
Caste: The Origins of Our Discontents
Court cases related to reservation in India
Forward caste
Reserved political positions in India
Caste politics
Reservation policy in Tamil Nadu
Jat reservation agitation
Reverse discrimination in India

Notes

References

https://m.thewire.in/article/government/jharkhand-raises-reservations-for-sc-st-obc-ews-groups-to-77

Further reading

Shourie, Arun (2012). Falling over backwards: An essay on reservations and judicial populism. New Delhi: HarperCollins Publishers.

External links
 National Commission for Backward Classes
 National Commission for Scheduled Castes
 National Commission for Scheduled Tribes
 Ministry of Social Justice & Empowerment

 
Law of India
Politics of India